9th Arrondissement may refer to:
 9th arrondissement of Lyon, France
 9th arrondissement of Paris, France
 9th arrondissement of Marseille, France
 9th arrondissement of the Littoral Department, Benin

Arrondissement name disambiguation pages